Thomas Montgomerie Duncan (born 15 July 1936) is a Scottish retired professional football outside left, best remembered for his 11 years in the Scottish League with Airdrieonians. He also briefly played in the Football League on loan at Newport County. Duncan later managed Queen's Park between November 1969 and May 1974.

Tommy Duncan's senior professional football career commenced as a 16 year old in the Scottish Highland Football League with his local senior football club, Buckie Thistle FC. His talents were spotted in the summer of 1952 when Airdrie FC played a two-game Highland pre-season tour, with one of the games played against Buckie Thistle at Victoria Park, Buckie, where Duncan shone on the Buckie Thistle left wing, and Airdrie subsequently, and quickly signed him, and where he spent the next eleven seasons at Airdrie.

References 

Scottish footballers
Scottish Football League players
Living people
1936 births
Scottish football managers
Scottish Football League managers
Association football outside forwards
Queen's Park F.C. managers
Buckie Thistle F.C. players
Airdrieonians F.C. (1878) players
Newport County A.F.C. players
English Football League players
Falkirk F.C. players
Footballers from Aberdeenshire